Mehdi Dehbi (born 5 December 1985) is a Belgian actor and theatre director, known for his roles in  (2009, English title: He is My Girl),  (2011), Le Fils de l'Autre (2012, English title: The Other Son), Mary Queen of Scots (2013), and A Most Wanted Man (2014). In 2020, he played the title role in the Netflix series Messiah.

Early life
From the age of ten, Dehbi attended the  theater and music school, which had been established in the hospital building where he had been born.

After studying drama and music at the Royal Conservatory of Brussels, then at the CNSAD in Paris, and finally at the London Academy of Music and Dramatic Art, he pursued his career in film and theater.

In 2012 Mehdi directed his first play, Les Justes by Albert Camus at the Théâtre de Liège.

Filmography

Theatre

Theatre directing

References

External links

1985 births
Living people
Belgian people of Tunisian descent
Belgian male film actors
Belgian male television actors
21st-century Belgian male actors
Belgian male stage actors
Actors from Liège